Pediasia numidella is a moth in the family Crambidae. It was described by Hans Rebel in 1903. It is found in Algeria, Iran, Bahrein, Saudi Arabia, Kuwait and the United Arab Emirates.

References

Crambini
Moths described in 1903
Moths of Africa
Moths of Asia